Lacombe-Ponoka is a provincial electoral district in central Alberta, Canada created in 2003. The district is mandated to return a single member to the Legislative Assembly.

History
The electoral district was created in the 2003 boundary redistribution mostly from the abolished electoral districts of Lacombe-Stettler and Ponoka-Rimbey.

The 2010 boundary redistribution saw the riding lose the town of Rimbey to the new district of Rimbey-Rocky Mountain House-Sundre and it also lost land that resided within Camrose County to the electoral district of Battle River-Wainwright.

Boundary history

Representation history

The electoral district and its predecessor ridings have been returning candidates affiliated with the Progressive Conservatives with large majorities since the 1970s. The current representative is Ray Prins who was first elected to office in 2004 when the district was created. He represented the district for two terms with majorities well above half the popular vote.

Legislature results

2004 general election

2008 general election

2012 general election

2015 general election

2019 general election

Senate nominee results

2004 Senate nominee election district results
Voters had the option of selecting 4 Candidates on the Ballot

2012 Senate nominee election district results

Student Vote results

2004 election

On November 19, 2004 a Student Vote was conducted at participating Alberta schools to parallel the 2004 Alberta general election results. The vote was designed to educate students and simulate the electoral process for persons who have not yet reached the legal majority. The vote was conducted in 80 of the 83 provincial electoral districts with students voting for actual election candidates. Schools with a large student body that reside in another electoral district had the option to vote for candidates outside of the electoral district than where they were physically located.

2012 election

References

External links 
Website of the Legislative Assembly of Alberta

Alberta provincial electoral districts
Lacombe, Alberta
Ponoka, Alberta